The Journal is an American, English language daily newspaper serving New Ulm, Minnesota.  It has a circulation of 9,291.

See also
 List of newspapers in Minnesota

References

Newspapers published in Minnesota
Daily newspapers published in the United States